Bessie Potter Vonnoh (August 17, 1872 – March 8, 1955) was an American sculptor best known for her small bronzes, mostly of domestic scenes, and for her garden fountains. Her stated artistic objective, as she told an interviewer in 1925, was to “look for beauty in the every-day world, to catch the joy and swing of modern American life.”

Early years 
Bessie Onahotema Potter was born in St Louis, Missouri, the only child of Ohio natives Alexander and Mary McKenney Potter. Her father died in 1874, in an accident, at age 38. By 1877, she and her mother had joined members of her mother's family in Chicago.

In school she enjoyed clay-modeling class and decided at an early age that she wanted to be a sculptor. In 1886, at age 14, she enrolled in classes at the Art Institute of Chicago. She was able to afford the tuition only because a local sculptor, Lorado Taft, hired her to work as a studio assistant on Saturdays. From 1890 to 1891 she studied with Taft at the Art Institute, as she completed its sculpture courses.

Early works 

Vonnoh became one of the so-called "White Rabbits", women artists including Helen Farnsworth Mears and Janet Scudder who assisted Taft on the sculpture program for the Horticultural Building at the 1893 World's Columbian Exposition in Chicago. She also produced an independent commission, the Personification of Art, for the Illinois State Building of the exposition.

In 1895, she traveled to Europe, and met Auguste Rodin. Her best-known statuette, Young Mother (1896), used fellow "White Rabbit" Margaret Daisy Gerow (Mody) Proctor, wife of sculptor Alexander Phimister Proctor, and their infant son as models. In 1898, she received the commission for a bust of General Samuel W. Crawford for the Smith Memorial Arch in Philadelphia.

In 1899 she married impressionist painter Robert Vonnoh, at his home in Rockland Lake, New York, and honeymooned in Paris. At the 1900 Exposition Universelle, she was awarded a Bronze Medal for A Young Mother and exhibited another statuette, Girl Dancing.

She exhibited at both the 1901 Pan-American Exposition in Buffalo, New York, receiving an honorable mention for A Young Mother, and at the 1904 Louisiana Purchase Exposition in St Louis, Missouri, where she was awarded a Gold Medal for a group of ten works.

Middle years 

In March 1903, the New York Times noted that the Vonnohs were two of a dozen painters and sculptors who got together to create a building specifically for their studios, at 27 West Sixty-Seventh Street in Manhattan. In mid-1903, the Vonnohs began summering in Old Lyme, Connecticut, and became long-time members of its Old Lyme Art Colony.

Vonnoh's small-scale works were suited to the size and style of the average American home, and had broad appeal. Many of her works, such as Water lilies, were portraits.  Vonnoh's statue Water lilies (1913) was based on the daughter of fellow artists Helen Savier and Frank DuMond at Lyme. Vonnoh stated that she was "determined to prove that as perfect a likeness and as much beauty could be produced in statuettes twelve inches in height, and in busts of six inches, as could be had in the life-size and colossal productions suitable for so few houses."

In December 1912, the New York Times, writing about her works at the New York Academy of Art, called her figurines "lovely", of a "charming style", and said "we must applaud once more her skillful harmonizing of detail in the contemporary costume, her selection of the most distinguished line for emphasis." In 1915, Vonnoh exhibited in the Armory Show. In 1921, she was elected an academician of the National Academy of Design. She was elected to the American Academy of Arts and Letters in 1931.

In 1933, her husband died at age 75. In 1937, Vonnoh completed her best-known large-scale work, the Burnett Memorial Fountain in Central Park.

Later years 
After her first husband's death, Vonnoh produced relatively little. She married again in 1948, to Dr. Edward L. Keyes, Jr., a widower, who died only nine months later. Vonnoh herself died in New York City in 1955, at age 82. She is buried alongside her first husband, Robert Vonnoh (1858 – 1933), in the Duck River Cemetery in Old Lyme, Connecticut.

Gallery

Exhibition history 
 American Women Artists: 1830–1930, The National Museum of Women in the Arts, 1987
 Four Centuries of Women’s Art, The National Museum of Women in the Arts, 1990
 Bessie Potter Vonnoh: Sculptor of Women, Florence Griswold Museum, 2008

References

Further reading 
 Aronson, Julie. Bessie Potter Vonnoh: Sculptor of Women. Athens: Ohio University Press, 2008;
 Baigell, Matthew (1979) "Vonnoh, Bessie Potter" Dictionary of American Art Harper & Row, Publishers, New York;
 Bowman, John S. (ed.) (1995) "Vonnoh, Bessie (Onahotema) Potter"  The Cambridge Dictionary of American Biography  Cambridge University Press, Cambridge, England;
 Falk, Peter Hastings (1985) "Vonnoh, Bessie Potter" Who Was Who in American Art: 1898-1947 Sound View Press, Madison, CT;
 Garraty, John A. and Carnes, Mark C. (eds.) (1999) "Vonnoh, Bessie Onahotema Potter" American National Biography  Oxford University Press, New York;
 Heller, Jules and Heller, Nancy G. (1995) "Vonnoh, Bessie Potter" North American Women Artists of the Twentieth Century: A biographical dictionary Garland Publishing, New York

External links

 Bessie Potter Vonnoh Papers Online at the Smithsonian Archives of American Art
Missouri Remembers: Artists in Missouri through 1951

1872 births
1955 deaths
American women sculptors
Members of the American Academy of Arts and Letters
Modern sculptors
Artists from St. Louis
National Academy of Design members
19th-century American sculptors
20th-century American sculptors
Sculptors from Missouri
School of the Art Institute of Chicago alumni
20th-century American women artists
19th-century American women artists
National Sculpture Society members